Woodland High School is a small public high school located at 5800 E 3000 North Road in Streator, Illinois, USA. Its athletic teams play in the Tri-County Conference. Its mascot is the Warriors.

References

External links
 Woodland Community Unit School District #5 website

Public high schools in Illinois
Streator, Illinois
Schools in LaSalle County, Illinois